V. T. Thomas (6 June 1929 – 27 April 2016), also known as Toms, was a cartoonist from Kerala, India who created the cartoon characters Boban and Molly.

Early life and career
Toms was born to Vaadakkal Thoppil Kunjuthomman Kunjithomman and Sicily Thomas on 6 June 1929 in Kuttanad of Alappuzha district. He completed his graduation from SB College, Changanassery. Later he joined the army as an electrician and left the job soon. He then devoted his career completely to drawing cartoons. His elder brother Peter Thomas was his inspiration behind drawings. Peter was a cartoonist at Shankar's Weekly at that time. Toms started his career in 1950 through Sathyadeepam, a Catholic weekly and Kerala Kaumudi. He then joined Malayala Manorama in 1955.

Boban and Molly

Toms created the Malayalam cartoon characters Boban and Molly, the brother sister duos accompanied by a tiny puppy based on two real life persons of the same name. They were two children from his neighborhood and he discovered them in his 30s. Boban and Molly (ബോബനും മോളിയും) first appeared in the cartoon column of Sathyadeepam. Later the characters became more popular through Malayala Manorama. They were first published in 1957.
He resigned from Manorama in 1987 and started Toms Publications.

Other characters created by Toms

Toms also created other characters which appeared along with Boban and Molly, which all represented various personalities and life style of Keralites.
 Pothen Vakkeel and Wife- Parents of the kids
 Appy Hippy - The local romoeo
 Ittunnan and Chettathy - Panchayath president and his wife
 Motta - Friend of Boban and Molly
 Unnikkuttan - a naughty kid
 Kunchukuruppu - an intelligent and witty person
 Aasan - A knowledgeable and witty person
 Uppayi Mapla - A village simpleton

Film adaptation
A film Bobanum Moliyum based on the characters was released in 1971 directed by J. Sasikumar, starring Madhu and Kaviyoor Ponnamma. In 2006, an animation film was also released.

Books
Autobiography of Toms, titled Ente Bobanum Molliyum was released on 29 December 2015 by actor Mammootty.

Personal life
Toms was married to Thresiakutty. They have 6 children. Two of them were named Boban and Molly.

Death
He died on 27 April 2016 at SH Medical Centre in Kottayam around 10.45 PM. He was suffering from age related illness.

References

External links
 Bobanum Moliyum Cartoons
 Cartoon window
 Artist Directory
 The Hindu
 Managing Intellectual Property
 On TV

1929 births
2016 deaths
Malayali people
Indian cartoonists
Writers from Kerala
People from Alappuzha district
Indian comics artists
Indian comics writers